American Craftsman is an American domestic architectural style, inspired by the Arts and Crafts movement, which included interior design, landscape design, applied arts, and decorative arts, beginning in the last years of the 19th century. Its immediate ancestors in American architecture are the Shingle style, which began the move away from Victorian ornamentation toward simpler forms; and the Prairie style of Frank Lloyd Wright. The name "Craftsman" was appropriated from furniture-maker Gustav Stickley, whose magazine The Craftsman was first published in 1901. The architectural style was most widely used in small-to-medium-sized Southern California single-family homes from about 1905, so that the smaller-scale Craftsman style became known alternatively as "California bungalow". The style remained popular into the 1930s, and has continued with revival and restoration projects through present times.

Influences 
The American Craftsman style was a 20th century American offshoot of the British Arts and Crafts movement, which began as early as the 1860s.

A successor of other 19th century movements, such as the Gothic Revival and the Aesthetic Movement, the British Arts and Crafts movement was a reaction against the deteriorating quality of goods during the Industrial Revolution, and the corresponding devaluation of human labor, over-dependence on machines, and disbanding of the guild system. Members of the Arts and Crafts movement also balked at Victorian eclecticism, which cluttered rooms with mismatched, faux-historic goods in an attempt to convey a sense of worldliness. The movement emphasized handwork over mass production, and was in some ways just as much of a social movement as it was an aesthetic one, emphasizing the plight of the industrial worker and equating moral rectitude with the ability to create beautiful but simple things. These social currents can especially be seen in the writings of John Ruskin and William Morris, both highly influential thinkers for the movement. In addition, adherents sought to elevate the status of art forms that had here-to-for been seen as a mere trade and not fine art.

The American movement also reacted against the eclectic Victorian "over-decorated" aesthetic; however, the arrival of the Arts and Crafts movement in late 19th century America coincided with the decline of the Victorian era. While the American Arts and Crafts movement shared many of the same goals of the British movement, such as social reform, a return to traditional simplicity over gaudy historic styles, the use of local natural materials, and the elevation of handicraft, it was also able to innovate: unlike the British movement, which had never been very good at figuring out how to make handcrafted production scalable, American Arts and Crafts designers were more adept at the business side of design and architecture, and were able to produce wares for a staunchly middle class market. Gustav Stickley, in particular, hit a chord in the American populace with his goal of ennobling modest homes for a rapidly expanding American middle class, embodied in the Craftsman Bungalow style.

In architecture, reacting to both Victorian architectural opulence and increasingly common mass-produced housing, the style incorporated a visibly sturdy structure of clean lines and natural materials. The movement's name American Craftsman came from the popular magazine, The Craftsman, founded in October 1901 by philosopher, designer, furniture maker, and editor Gustav Stickley. The magazine featured original house and furniture designs by Harvey Ellis, the Greene and Greene company, and others. The designs, while influenced by the ideals of the British movement, found inspiration in specifically American antecedents such as Shaker furniture and the Mission Revival Style, and the Anglo-Japanese style. Emphasis on the originality of the artist/craftsman led to the later design concepts of the 1930s Art Deco movement. The architect and designer Frank Lloyd Wright, himself a member of the Chicago Arts and Crafts Society, was inspired by the style to become an innovator in the Prairie School of architecture and design, which shared many common goals with the Arts and Crafts movement.

The Boston Society of Arts and Crafts 
The Arts and Crafts Movement first emerged in the United States in Boston in the 1890s. The area was very receptive to the ideas of the Arts and Crafts movement due to prominent thinkers like the transcendentalist Ralph Waldo Emerson, and Harvard Art History professor Charles Eliot Norton, who was a personal friend of British Art and Crafts leader William Morris. The movement began with the first American Arts and Crafts Exhibition organized by the printer Henry Lewis Johnson in April 1897 at Copley Hall, featuring over 1,000 objects made by designers and craftspeople.

The exhibition's success led to the formation of the Boston Society of Arts and Crafts in June 1897 with Charles Eliot Norton as president. The society aimed to "develop and encourage higher standards in the handicrafts." The Society focused on the relationship of artists and designers to the world of commerce, and on high-quality workmanship.

The Society of Arts and Crafts mandate was soon expanded into a credo that read:

The society held its first exhibition in 1899 at Copley Hall.

Notable Craftsman designers

In Southern California, the Pasadena-based firm Greene and Greene was the most renowned practitioner of the original American Craftsman Style. Their projects for Ultimate bungalows include the Gamble House and Robert R. Blacker House in Pasadena, and the Thorsen House in Berkeley, California—with numerous others in California. Other examples in the Los Angeles region include the Arts and Crafts Lummis House by Theodore Eisen and Sumner P. Hunt, along the Arroyo Seco in Highland Park, California and the Journey House, located in Pasadena.

In Northern California, architects renowned for their well planned and detailed projects in the Craftsman style include Bernard Maybeck, with the Swedenborgian Church, and Julia Morgan, with the Asilomar Conference Grounds and Mills College projects. Many other designers and projects represent the style in the region.

In San Diego, California, the style was also popular. Architect David Owen Dryden designed and built many Craftsman California bungalows in the North Park district, now a proposed Dryden Historic District. The 1905 Marston House of George Marston in Balboa Park was designed by local architects Irving Gill and William Hebbard.

In the early 1900s, developer Herberg J. Hapgood built numbers of Craftsman-style homes, many from stucco, that comprise the lakeside borough of Mountain Lakes, New Jersey. Residents were called "Lakers." The homes followed signature styles, including bungalows and chalets. Hapgood eventually went bankrupt.

The Castle in the Clouds, a mountaintop estate built in the Ossipee Mountains of New Hampshire in 1913–1914 for Thomas Gustave Plant by architect J. Williams Beal, is an example of the American Craftsman style in New England.

Common architectural features
 Low-pitched roof lines, usually a gabled roof, occasionally a hip roof
 Deeply overhanging eaves
 Exposed rafters or decorative brackets under eaves
 Wide front porch beneath extension of main roof or front-facing gable
 Tapered, square columns supporting porch roof
 4-over-1 or 6-over-1 double-hung windows
 Shingle roofs and siding;
 Hand-crafted stone and/or woodwork
 Mixed materials throughout structure

See also

 American Foursquare
 Bungalow
 California bungalow
 Mar del Plata style

References

Further reading

External links

 Craftsman Perspective—Site devoted to Arts and Crafts architecture, featuring over 220 house photos, including Craftsman and Mission styles
 American Bungalow Magazine—dedicated to discuss remodeling, restoring, furnishing, and living in different types of Bungalow style homes including Craftsman.
 Craftsman Magazine—Every issue of Gustav Stickley's magazine digitized on the University of Wisconsin Digital Collections website.

 
20th-century architectural styles
American architectural styles
Arts and Crafts architecture in the United States
Arts and Crafts movement
Decorative arts
History of furniture
House styles